China competed as the host nation of the 2022 Winter Paralympics in Beijing, China that took place between 4–13 March 2022. In total, 96 athletes were initially expected to compete.
The total competition places that the Chinese delegation achieved is 116.
It is the largest delegation to compete at the Games.

China topped the medal table for the first time, becoming the first Asian country to top the medal count with more gold medals, more silver medals, more bronze medals, and more medals overall than any other nation. China also broke the record for the most gold medals, the most silvers medals, the most bronze medals and the most medal overall won by Asian countries at a single Winter Paralympics.

Medalists

The following Chinese competitors won medals at the games. In the discipline sections below, the medalists' names are bolded.

| width="56%" align="left" valign="top" |

| width="22%" align="left" valign="top" |

Administration
The delegation consists of 96 athletes and 121 staff members. Biathlete and para cross-country skier Guo Yujie and para ice hockey player Wang Zhidong were the flagbearers for China during the opening ceremony.

Competitors
The following is the list of number of competitors participating at the Games per sport/discipline.

Alpine skiing

China competed in alpine skiing.

Biathlon

China competed in biathlon.

Cross-country skiing

China competed in cross-country skiing.

Para ice hockey

China automatically qualified as the host.

Summary

Preliminary round

Quarterfinal

Semifinal

Bronze medal game

Snowboarding

China competed in snowboarding.

Wheelchair curling

China automatically qualified as the host.

Summary

Round robin

Draw 1
Saturday, March 5, 14:35

Draw 3
Sunday, March 6, 9:35

Draw 5
Sunday, March 6, 19:35

Draw 7
Monday, March 7, 14:35

Draw 8
Monday, March 7, 19:35

Draw 11
Tuesday, March 8, 19:35

Draw 12
Wednesday, March 9, 9:35

Draw 13
Wednesday, March 9, 14:35

Draw 15
Thursday, March 10, 9:35

Draw 17
Thursday, March 10, 19:35

Semifinal
Friday, March 11, 14:35

Final

See also
China at the Paralympics
China at the 2022 Winter Olympics

References

Nations at the 2022 Winter Paralympics
2022
Winter Paralympics